Calverleigh (anciently Calwoodleigh) is a village, parish and former manor in Devon, England, situated 2 miles north-west of Tiverton. the parish church is dedicated to St Mary. The resident lords of the manor were for many generations the Calwoodleigh family.

Calverleigh Court
The manor house called Calverleigh Court is situated to the west of the parish church and was rebuilt in 1844-5 by Joseph Chichester Nagle to the design of George Wightwick (1802-1872) of Plymouth.

References

Villages in Devon